Benzar may refer to the following:
Romario Benzar (born 1992), Romanian footballer
Daniel Benzar (born 1997), Romanian footballer
Benzar, a Star Trek planet

Romanian-language surnames